The 1994 Westminster Titans football team was an American football team that represented Westminster College of Pennsylvania as a member of Mideast League (MEL) within the Mid-States Football Association (MSFA) during the 1994 NAIA Division II football season. In their fourth season under head coach Gene Nicholson, the Titans compiled a 12–2 record.

Schedule

NAIA playoffs

First round vs. Findlay
Findlay led, 23–14, at the start of the fourth quarter. The Titans came from behind with four fourth-quarter touchdowns by junior running back Andy Blatt. Blatt rushed for 96 yards on 20 carries and scored five touchdowns in the game. Westminster quarterback Sean O'Shea completed 20 of 32 passes for 254 yards. Westminster out-gained Findlay by 340 yards of total offense to 320.

Quarterfinal vs. Tiffin
On December 3, Westminster defeated , 42–14, in the NAIA Division II quarterfinal game at New Wilmington, Pennsylvania. Quarterback Sean O'Shea completed 22 of 29 passes for 340 yards and five touchdowns. He also broke Joe Micchia's career record by extending his total to 4,695 passing yards. Westminster back Andy Blatt also rushed for 152 yards and a touchdown on 20 carries. The Titans out-gained Tiffin by 582 yards to 354.

Semifinal vs. Lambuth
On December 10, No. 3 Westminster defeated No. 7 , 46–6, in an NAIA Division II semifinal game played before a crowd of 1,300 at Memorial Field in New Wilmington, Pennsylvania. Senior tailback Andy Blatt led the offense with 216 rushing yards and three touchdowns in the first half.

National championship game vs. Pacific Lutheran
On December 17, Westminster defeated , 27–7, in the NAIA Division II national championship game before a crowd of 4,357 at Civic Stadium in Portland, Oregon. The game was a rematch of the 1993 championship game won by Pacific Lutheran. Andy Blatt led the offense for Westminster, rushing for 128 yards and a touchdown and throwing a 60-yard touchdown pass. Westminster quarterback Sean O'Shea also threw two touchdown passes, and Tim McNeil also caught two touchdown passes.  The Titans also intercepted three passes off Pacific Lutheran quarterback Karl Hoseth. It was the sixth national championship for Westminster, following prior championships in 1970, 1976, 1977, 1988, and 1989.

References

Westminster
Westminster Titans football seasons
NAIA Football National Champions
Westminster Titans football